is a Japanese actor. He is a member of the theater group Gekidan Exile.

Machida is represented with LDH.

Biography 
Machida was born on 4 July 1990, in Higashiagatsuma, Japan. He has one younger and one older sister. Starting in elementary school, he learned Kendo until entering junior high school. After graduating junior high school, Machida joined the Japan Aviation High School in Ishikawa, as he had loved vehicles since his childhood and aspired to be a pilot. He started dancing when he was in high school and took on the role of captain in his dance club.  In his youth Machida also attended EXPG Tokyo, a talent school run by LDH.

Machida joined Gekidan EXILE on 25 January 2011, after successfully passing the Dai 3kai Gekidan EXILE Audition. Although in July 2011, he was announced as a candidate member of Generations from Exile Tribe and left Gekidan EXILE. In September of the same year, he injured the calf of his right leg and focused on recovering.

On 14 February 2012, it was reported that he had dropped out from being a Generations candidate and rejoined Gekidan EXILE to focus on acting.

On 20 November 2019, Machida released his first photo book titled BASIC.

On 31 March 2021, he participated in the Tokyo 2020 Olympic Torch Relay as a torchbearer for his prefecture Gunma. In the same year he was selected as ambassador for the special exhibition celebrating the 260th anniversary of the birth of the famous Japanese artist Hokusai.

On 25 December 2022, Machida announced that he married South Korean actress Hyunri.

Filmography

TV Drama

Films

Theater

Internet Drama

Radio Drama

TV Series

Music videos

Live

Voice acting

Game

Photobook

Awards and nominations

Personal life
Machida married a Japanese-Korean actress, on December 25, 2022.

References

External links

 
Official blog of Keita Machida

1990 births
Living people
People from Gunma Prefecture
Nippon Sport Science University alumni
Japanese male television actors
Japanese male film actors
21st-century Japanese male actors
LDH (company) artists